Roboto is a fictional character from the Masters of the Universe franchise.

Character history

The 1980s
Roboto was introduced into the Masters of the Universe toy line in 1985. His first appearance is in the Mattel mini-comic "The Battle of Roboto", in which he is built by Man-At-Arms, who gives him a cybernetically-enhanced heart, which enables him to feel human emotions and interact with his comrades as a human rather than as a machine.  He was an exceptionally brave fighter, even to the point of taking on Hordak in single combat in one issue.

Given that the accompanying cartoon series was drawing to a close at the time his action figure was released, Roboto only makes one appearance in the cartoon, but unlike most other figures released at this time, Roboto was lucky enough to get a whole episode written around him. This episode, "Happy Birthday Roboto" features a radically different origin story for him, in which he was a space explorer from the alien world of Robotica, who crash-landed on Eternia. Initially wrecked by the crash, he was repaired and restored by Man-At-Arms.

2002 series
Roboto features in the relaunch of the Masters of the Universe toy line and cartoon series in 2002. In the new cartoon, he is introduced in the episode "Roboto's Gambit", in which he is built by Man-At-Arms as a simple chess-playing robot. Desiring to apply his chess skills to the real battle around him, he upgrades himself to a warrior robot and effectively transfers his skills into the Masters' combat.

However, Teela refuses to let him join the fighting forces since he is not specifically designed for battle. However, during the prevailing incident of battling an army of small bone monsters controlled by Tri-Klops, which doubles its numbers every time it is destroyed, it is Roboto's analysis that determines the only way to defeat it is to attack Tri-Klops directly. To do so, Roboto advises He-Man of his idea and uses himself as a self-sacrifice to draw the enemy's attention to allow the superhero to approach his target. While He-Man is successful, Roboto is overwhelmed and seemingly destroyed before the enemy can be neutralized. Teela mourns his destruction and berates herself for not appreciating his courage and skills when offered. However, to her relief, her father then announces that she will have that opportunity as he presents the fully repaired Roboto who is ready to assume the duties Teela gladly offers. Subsequent episodes see him serving as the Masters' combat analyst.

Masters of the Universe: Revelation

Roboto appears in Masters of the Universe: Revelation  as one of Teela's allies.

Toy versions
The 1980s release was the contest winner from the He-Man Magazine, where readers got the chance to design a MOTU Figure, the winner got made.  It was won by Peter Sischo, who designed Roboto.

Reception

Roboto has had a mostly positive reception from critics. Comic Book Resources voted 13th best out of 15 Best He-Man Toys. Gizmodo ranked Roboto 21st best toy in Masters of the Universe.

References

Fictional characters introduced in 1983
Fictional androids
Masters of the Universe Heroic Warriors
Fictional robots
Male characters in animated series